Gadomski may refer to:
 Gadomski (crater), a lunar crater
 Gadomski (surname)

See also